Károly Koch (1885 – 25 March 1932) was a Hungarian coxswain. He competed at the 1924 Summer Olympics in Paris with the men's eight where they were eliminated in the round one repechage.

References

1885 births
1932 deaths
Hungarian male rowers
Olympic rowers of Hungary
Rowers at the 1924 Summer Olympics
Coxswains (rowing)
European Rowing Championships medalists